Mahabad is a city in northwestern Iran.

Mahabad may also refer to:

Places
 Republic of Mahabad,  a short-lived, Kurdish state of the 20th century, officially known as the Republic of Kurdistan
 Mahabad County,  a county in Iran
 Mahabad, Isfahan, a city in Isfahan Province, Iran
 Mahabad, Yazd, a city in Yazd Province, Iran
 Mahabad, Kerman, a village in Kerman Province, Iran
 Mahabad, Razavi Khorasan, a village in Razavi Khorasan Province, Iran
 Mahabad-e Jadid, a village in Razavi Khorasan Province, Iran
 Mahabad-e Olya, a village in Razavi Khorasan Province, Iran
 Mahabad, Tehran, a village in Tehran Province, Iran
 Mahabad Agricultural Training Camp, in West Azerbaijan Province, Iran

Other
 Mahabad (prophet), a pre-Zoroastrian Prophet
 Mahabad Qaradaghi (b. 1966),  Kurdish writer, poet and translator